Figure skating at the 2013 Winter Universiade was held at the Trento Ghiaccio Arena in Trento from December 11 to 15, 2013.

Medalists

Medal table

External links
 Official website
 Result Book – Figure Skating

 
2013 in figure skating
Figure skating
International figure skating competitions hosted by Italy
2013